Elgart is a surname. Notable people with the surname include:

 Bill Elgart (born 1942), American jazz drummer
 Larry Elgart (1922–2017), American jazz bandleader, brother of Les
 Les Elgart (1917–1995), American swing jazz bandleader and trumpeter

See also
 Elgort